Nélson Miguel Martins Pedroso (born 18 June 1985) is a Portuguese professional footballer who plays as a left-back for Merelinense.

Club career
Pedroso was born in Guimarães. He started playing at the professional level at the age of 23, appearing in only three Primeira Liga games for C.F. Estrela da Amadora over one full season; the club was also relegated due to financial irregularities.

Pedroso subsequently competed in the Segunda Liga, where he represented C.D. Aves and Portimonense SC. Whilst at the service of the former team, he won the SJPF Player of the Month for October 2011. 

On 1 August 2014, after two years as first choice with Vitória F.C. in the top division, Pedroso signed with F.C. Paços de Ferreira of the same league. The following 12 July, he returned to the second tier after agreeing to a two-year contract at Aves.

From 2017 to 2019, Pedroso also played in division two, with Académica de Coimbra.

References

External links

1985 births
Living people
Sportspeople from Guimarães
Portuguese footballers
Association football defenders
Primeira Liga players
Liga Portugal 2 players
Segunda Divisão players
C.D. Aves players
G.D.R.C. Os Sandinenses players
AD Oliveirense players
G.D. Ribeirão players
C.F. Estrela da Amadora players
Portimonense S.C. players
Vitória F.C. players
F.C. Paços de Ferreira players
Associação Académica de Coimbra – O.A.F. players
Merelinense F.C. players